Wilhelm Holec (8 June 1914 – MIA 23 August 1944) was an Austrian footballer.

References

External links
 Rapid Archiv

1914 births
1944 deaths
Austrian footballers
Austria international footballers
Association football forwards
First Vienna FC players
SK Rapid Wien players
Missing in action of World War II
Austrian military personnel killed in World War II
Austrian military personnel of World War II